This is a list of career statistics of Swiss professional tennis player Timea Bacsinszky since her professional debut in 2004. Bacsinszky has won four singles titles and five doubles titles on the WTA Tour. She also partnered Martina Hingis to win a silver medal in women's doubles at the 2016 Summer Olympics.

Performance timelines

Only main-draw results in WTA Tour, Grand Slam tournaments and Olympic Games are included in win–loss records.

Singles

Doubles

Significant finals

Premier Mandatory finals

Singles: 1 runner-up

Olympic finals

Doubles: 1 (silver medal)

WTA career finals

Singles: 7 (4 titles, 3 runner-ups)

Doubles: 9 (5 titles, 4 runner-ups)

WTA Challenger finals

Doubles: 2 (1 title, 1 runner-up)

ITF Circuit finals

Singles: 20 (13 titles, 7 runner–ups)

Doubles: 22 (14 titles, 8 runner–ups)

Grand Slam tournament seedings

Head-to-head records

Record against top 10 players
Bacsinszky's record against players who have been ranked in the top 10. Active players are in boldface.

Wins over top 10 players

Notes

References

External links
 
 
 Timea Bacsinszky at CoreTennis

Bacsinszky, Timea